Eastercon is the common name for the annual British national science fiction convention. The convention is organised by voluntary self-organising committees, rather than a permanent entity.

Organisation
Groups of fans (typically 5–8 in number) get together to form "bid committees" and plan where they want to hold the Eastercon, who they want to be their guests of honour, what the theme of the convention will be, etc. They circulate their proposals and the winning bid is chosen by a vote among the people who attend the bid session at the Eastercon two years in advance, or one year if no bid was successful at the bid session two years out. Until the early 1990s there were commonly several bids to hold the Eastercon, but since then the realisation appears to have grown that putting on an Eastercon involves a lot of hard work, and now it is normal for there to be only one serious bid - Reclamation in 2022 saw the first contested bid (for 2023) in some 30 years. There may also be a number of joke bids - it is rumoured that in 1989 the joke bid for Inconceivable narrowly beat the serious bid for Speculation on the initial show of hands, but the chair arranged a lobby vote which then went the "right" way. In some years e.g. 2005, 2009, no serious bids are made, but one usually emerges in the following year.

As Eastercons are fan-run/not-for-profit events, the money raised by membership, advertising etc. is spent on running the convention. It is traditional that any surplus is used for the benefit of the convention members, fandom in general or donated to charity. This may include sponsoring items at other conventions, buying equipment for use by other conventions, donating to the RNIB to get works of SF literature converted to talking books for the blind, donating to the Science Fiction Foundation to fund a variety of educational projects relating to science fiction, and funding international fannish visits (often through The League of Fan Funds).

Venues
Certain Eastercon host venues have fallen in and out of fashion at various times. Often a particular hotel offers a good package for several years, then the management prices itself out of the market. For example, the Liverpool Adelphi was used five times between 1988 and 1999. It was due to be used again in 2007 but that convention was forced to cancel, in part because of the hotel's poor reputation among fandom. Glasgow was used four times between 1980 and 1991, then there was a break until 2000. Hinckley was used three times between 2001 and 2005 and was seriously considered for 2008 before Heathrow was chosen instead, but it has since come under new management who carried out extensive renovation work and then decided not to host Redemption in 2009.  Finding suitable venues for an Eastercon (enough function and social space of the right types, enough bedrooms, low enough rates, not in a city that's already hosting a big event on the Easter weekend, willing to put up with Eastercon's numerous unusual requirements such as supply of real ale, etc.) is a difficult job.

Two-year bidding
People claim there is little need to have a two-year lead time as the convention can be organised in less than a year. Others point out it is hard enough finding venues with more than two years to go, so potentially losing some of those makes it even more difficult. It also means only one year to get people to join, so the committee can't predict the number of members. There are banking and taxation implications to take into account if bidding over a one-year period as some bank accounts have restrictions on how much money can be paid into an account without incurring further charges and if the convention financial year is only 12 months, they are at greater risk of breaking the VAT threshold, thus increasing the costs and administration for the convention. This is a contentious issue and a frequent subject for debate.

Eastercon traditions
The Doc Weir award is voted on and presented each year at Eastercon to an "unsung hero" of British fandom.

The George Hay Memorial Lecture, a presentation on a scientific topic by an invited speaker, has been held every Eastercon since 2Kon in 2000. The lecturer and subject are selected and paid for by the Science Fiction Foundation who offer this programme item to each year's Eastercon.  Since 2009 the British Science Fiction Association has presented a similar lecture, drawing speakers from the arts and humanities.

Trademark
In 2003 at Seacon, a fan offered to obtain the UK trademark for "Eastercon" on behalf of UK fandom and this was agreed by that year's convention. This trademark was subsequently obtained, meaning that any group that now wants to use the "Eastercon" name must obtain permission from the trademark holder first.

History
From 1948 until the 1960s, the convention was held over the three-day Whitsun bank holiday at the end of May. It has taken place over the four-day Easter holiday weekend ever since then. The pre-1960s conventions are generally considered to have been "Eastercons" even though they were not held over Easter.

List of Eastercons

Notes: 
Early conventions did not always have a particular name, and sometimes were given a name retrospectively when another Eastercon was held in the same town, e.g. Brumcon only acquired its name when Brumcon II was held in Birmingham. 
The 1957 convention held in Kettering has acquired a semi-mythical status among British fandom, since at a distance of more than 60 years nobody who might have attended can definitely remember actually attending this one, as opposed to the other Kettering conventions in 1955, 1956 and 1958, and there does not appear to be any surviving contemporary documentation from the con itself; however, there is just enough evidence from fanzines of the time and other fannish memorabilia to suggest that it did, in fact, take place. 
The official numbering of the conventions has been somewhat adjusted, following the naming of the 1972 convention as "Eastercon 22" which necessitated the counting of 21 previous Eastercons, which is why the 1951 Festivention is not counted.
Convoy, the 2007 Eastercon elected by members of Concussion, was cancelled at the end of October 2006. Contemplation was formed at the 2006 Novacon by Chris O'Shea and Fran Dowd as a very short notice emergency replacement. Convoy's guests of honour were invited to attend, and Sharyn November initially accepted, but she was ultimately unable to attend due to work commitments.
Pasgon was elected at Dysprosium to be the 2017 Eastercon to be held in Cardiff, but had to be cancelled in March 2016 due to issues with its planned venue. Eastercon 2017/Innominate in Birmingham was elected in its place at Mancunicon.
The 2020 convention, Concentric was cancelled less than a month before it was scheduled, due to recently announced UK Government guidelines related to the coronavirus pandemic. An online bidding session was held, with ConFusion selected for the 2021 Eastercon. 846 members had registered before the convention was cancelled.
The 2021 Eastercon, ConFusion was originally planned as an in person event, but was converted to an online event when it became clear that an in person convention would not be possible. 466 people took part in the online convention.
The 2022 convention, Reclamation had 797 registered members. 659 were physically present. 80 people viewed streamed panels, 41 of those were not present at the convention.

Future Eastercons
 2023: The 2023 Eastercon, "Conversation", is due to be held during the 2023 Easter Bank Holiday weekend, at the Birmingham Hilton Metropole, the same location as was used by the 2011 and 2017 Eastercons.
 2024: The 2024 Eastercon, Levitation, will be held from the 29th of March to 1st of April weekend, at Telford International Centre. This is the first time the convention will be at that location, and marks a divergence from tradition, in that the convention will be in a conference centre rather than in a hotel.

References

External links
Eastercon.org - the central Eastercon website
Eastercon Trademark - FAQ (Revised 2013)
THE WHITCON (1948) - surviving documents of the first 'Eastercon' before they became Eastercons
SciCon70 - the 1970 Eastercon
Convoy - the cancelled 2007 Eastercon (see Contemplation above)
Illustrious 2011 - the 2011 Eastercon
Olympus 2012 - the 2012 Eastercon
EightSquaredCon - the 2013 Eastercon
Satellite 4 - the 2014 Eastercon
Running the Eastercon - a "how to run an Eastercon" guide by Steve Davies, Chair of Reconvene
The Conbledegook File - a glossary of Eastercon related jargon
Where's the Eastercon? - a link to the current venue via what3words.com

Science fiction conventions in the United Kingdom
Recurring events established in 1948
1948 establishments in the United Kingdom
Festivals established in 1948